Yum sen lon, also known as a Yum salad is a Laotian salad. It is served with watercress, lettuce, tomato, boiled egg, with mayonnaise and peanuts.

See also
 List of salads

References

Salads
Lao cuisine